The mourning wheatear (Oenanthe lugens) is a bird, one of 14 species of wheatear found in northern Africa and the Middle East. It is a small passerine in a group formerly classed as members of the thrush family Turdidae, but now more generally considered to be part of the Old World flycatcher family Muscicapidae.

The mourning wheatear was first described by Martin Lichtenstein in 1823. It is found in semi-desert areas in North Africa and the Middle East. It is sexually dimorphic with the females sporting more subtle plumage.

Panov (Wheatears of Palearctic, 2005) discusses the latest taxonomy for the mourning wheatear superspecies. The mourning wheatear is split from Abyssinian wheatear (Oenanthe lugubris), which is the species found south of the Sahara. The Maghreb wheatear (O. halophila) and basalt wheatear (O. warriae) were formerly considered subspecies of the mourning wheatear, but were split as distinct species by the IOC in 2021. The Egyptian populations of O. lugens are discussed in Baha El Din and Baha El Din (2000). These birds differ from halophila in exhibiting less sexual dimorphism, and displaying a prominent white wingbar, and thus are closer to the nominate race.

It has been recorded in the following countries: Algeria, Bahrain, Cyprus, Egypt, Iran, Iraq, Israel, Jordan, Kuwait, Lebanon, Libya, Morocco, Oman, Pakistan, Qatar, Saudi Arabia, Syria, Tunisia, Turkey, the United Arab Emirates, and Yemen.

References

Further reading
Boon, Leo J. R. (2004) 'Mourning Wheatears' illustrated Dutch Birding 26(4): 223-36

Wheatears
Birds of North Africa
Birds of the Middle East
Birds described in 1823
Taxonomy articles created by Polbot